Cao Keming (November 1934 – 2 September 2014), also known as "Clear Sky Cao" and "Contemporary Bao Zheng", was a politician of the People's Republic of China. He served as Chairman of Jiangsu Provincial Committee of the Chinese People's Political Consultative Conference between February 1998 to March 2003, Secretary of Jiangsu Provincial Committee of the Central Commission for Discipline Inspection of the Chinese Communist Party, from July 1987 to September 2001, and Deputy Secretary of the Jiangsu Provincial Committee of the CPC between February 1991 to September 2001.

He was a delegate to the 13th, 14th and 15th CPC National Congresses and a member of the 9th CPPCC National Committee.

Life
Cao was born and raised in Nanyang, Henan, during the Republic of China.

He got involved in politics in November 1951 and joined the Chinese Communist Party in July 1959.

Cao worked as a manager at the Nanjing No. 307 Plant for over 20 years. Beginning in 1953, he served in several posts in Nanjing, capital of Jiangsu province, including group leader, section chief,  factory director, and CPC Party Chief.

In July 1987, Cao was promoted to become the Secretary of Jiangsu Provincial Committee of the Central Commission for Discipline Inspection, a position he held until September 2001. He also served as Deputy Secretary of the Jiangsu Provincial Committee of the CPC between February 1991 to September 2001. In 1996, he investigated and prosecuted the illegal fund-raising case of Wuxi Emerging Industrial Company, and he was awarded "First-Class Merit". In 2002, the corruption case of Ma Xiangdong (Vice-Mayor of Shenyang) was heard by him.

From February 1998 to March 2003, Cao served as the Chairman of Jiangsu Provincial Committee of the Chinese People's Political Consultative Conference.

In March 2003, he was transferred to Beijing as the Director of the Chinese Society and Law Committee of CPPCC, he served until March 2008.

On 2 September 2014, Cao died in Nanjing, Jiangsu.

References

1934 births
2014 deaths
People's Republic of China politicians from Henan
People from Nanyang, Henan
Political office-holders in Henan